Gazik District is in Darmian County, South Khorasan province, Iran. At the 2006 National Census, its population was 15,089 in 3,381 households. The following census in 2011 counted 15,772 people in 3,920 households. At the latest census in 2016, the district had 15,869 inhabitants in 3,937 households.

References 

Darmian County

Districts of South Khorasan Province

Populated places in South Khorasan Province

Populated places in Darmian County